Maori i Crni Gonzales is the debut album by the Serbian punk rock band Atheist Rap, released by Scorned Records in 1993. The album, previously available only on compact cassette, was rereleased by Take It Or Leave It Records, featuring bonus material.

Track listing 
All music and lyrics written by Atheist Rap. Some of the lyrics and music inspired by Dr Fuzz, Pekinška Patka, Deep Purple, Obojeni Program, Eddy Grant, Lazar Stojanović, Vranešević. Track 1 features the sampled speech of Josip Broz Tito.

Bonus tracks on the 1996 reissue

Personnel 
 Zare (Zoran Zarić; bass)
 Acke (Aleksandar Milovanov; drums)
 Goja (Stevan Gojkov; guitar)
 Radule (Vladimir Radusinović; guitar, vocals)
 Dr. Pop (Aleksandar Popov; vocals)
 Pećinko (Vladimir Kozbašić; vocals)

Additional personnel 
 Voja (artwork by [design])
 Marko Emer (photography))
 Ljuba (Ljubomir Pejić; producer)
 Peđa (Predrag Pejić; producer)

External links 
 EX YU ROCK enciklopedija 1960-2006, Janjatović Petar; 
 Maori i Crni Gonzales at Discogs

Atheist Rap albums
1993 debut albums